Ceglédbercel is a village in , Hungary.

References 

Populated places in Pest County
Hungarian German communities